Pajaroncillo is a municipality located in the province of Cuenca, Castile-La Mancha, Spain. It has a population of 68 (2014).

References

External links

Municipalities in the Province of Cuenca